This is a list of some of the mountains in the U.S. state of Massachusetts, including those in the mountain range known as the Berkshires.

Mount Greylock is the highest point in the state at 3,491 feet (1,064 m) in elevation. As such, no mountains in Massachusetts are recognized by the Appalachian Mountain Club in its list of Four-thousand footers — a list of New England peaks over 4,000 feet with a minimum 200 feet of topographic prominence.  Thousands of named summits in Massachusetts (including mountains and hills) are recognized by the USGS.

List

Mountain ranges in Massachusetts
Appalachian Mountains
The Berkshires
Hoosac Range
Taconic Mountains
 Metacomet Ridge
Wapack Range

See also
Geography of Massachusetts
List of mountains of the Appalachians

References

External links
Massachusetts highest named summits

Mountains
Massachusetts
Massachusetts